The 1963 CONCACAF Champions' Cup was the 2nd edition of the annual continental club football competition held in the CONCACAF region (North, Central America and the Caribbean), the CONCACAF Champions' Cup. It determined that year's club champion of association football in the CONCACAF region.

The tournament was played by 9 teams from 8 countries: Costa Rica, El Salvador, Guatemala, Haiti, Honduras, Mexico, Netherlands Antilles, and the United States. The tournament was played from 10 March 1963 till 18 August 1963, and was won by Haitien club Racing.

First round

CD Guadalajara gets bye to second round for winning 1962 tournament.

 Xelajú advance 8-2 on aggregate.

 Saprissa advance 3-1 on aggregate.

Second round

 CD Guadalajara advanced to the third round 2-0 on aggregate.

Saprissa received a bye to the third round.

Playoff re-match
Due to each team having won one match, a play-off was needed.

 Racing Haïtien advanced to the third round.

Third round

Racing Haïtien received a bye to the final round. 
CD Guadalajara advanced to the final round 3–0 on aggregate.

Final round
Difficulties in securing passports for Racing Haïtien's players in time for the September final in Guadalajara caused the match to be postponed three times. 

After CD Guadalajara protested to CONCACAF in February 1964, they were declared champions, but after a counter-protest, CONCACAF decided that both legs of the final should be played within two months of 2 April 1964. This decision meant that CD Guadalajara were forced to withdraw because they were on a tour of Europe during that time: therefore, the final was scratched, and Racing Haïtien were awarded the championship.

Champion

References 

1
CONCACAF Champions' Cup